John Moses (June 12, 1885March 3, 1945) was the 22nd Governor of North Dakota from 1939 to 1945, and served in the United States Senate in 1945 until his death that year. Excluding those appointed to fill brief vacancies, and those not seated at the beginning of their lawful terms, Moses is the shortest-serving U.S. senator ever, in office for just 59 days.

Biography
Moses was born in Strand in Rogaland county, Norway in 1885. He was the son of Reverend Henrik B. and Isabella (Eckersberg) Moses. He attended public school in Norway, and graduated from the high school at Kongsvinger in 1900 and from junior college in Oslo in 1903. He came to the United States in 1905 and worked for the Great Northern Railway from 1906 to 1911. He entered the University of North Dakota in 1912, and graduated with a Bachelor of Arts in 1914. He entered the University of North Dakota Law School and graduated with a Juris Doctor degree in 1915. He began practicing law at Hazen, North Dakota in 1917. He was married to Ethel Joslyn and had four children.

Political career
From 1919 until 1923, and later from 1927 until 1933, Moses served as State's Attorney for Mercer County. In 1936 he came in third in the three-way governor's race, behind former governor William Langer and incumbent governor Walter Welford (both Republicans). Moses became governor in 1939, following William Langer's second term in the office. Moses worked hard to reduce Langer's influence. He sought to cut government spending and to balance the state's budget. Moses was in office during World War II. He tried to encourage war-time industries to locate in the state, but North Dakota ranked last in the nation for receiving war spending. Despite the lack of wartime appropriations, Moses' administration was a time of prosperity for the state. Rainfall was plentiful and there was a ready market for agriculture products. Moses was a popular governor. During his election campaign he gave speeches in English, German, or Norwegian, depending on his audience. A Democrat, Moses was noted for his support from both political parties. In 1944 Moses defeated Gerald P. Nye for a seat in the United States Senate.

Death
Moses died on March 3, 1945, shortly after taking his place in the Senate. He is buried in St. Mary's Cemetery, Bismarck, North Dakota.

See also
 List of United States Congress members who died in office (1900–49)
 List of U.S. state governors born outside the United States
 List of United States senators born outside the United States

References

Further reading
Schweitzer, Adam John Moses and the New Deal in North Dakota (Master’s thesis, University of North Dakota, 1954)

External links

John Moses Papers at The University of North Dakota
Exhibits - North Dakota Governors - John Moses
Exhibits - North Dakota Governors Online Exhibit
National Governors Association

1885 births
1945 deaths
People from Strand, Norway
Norwegian emigrants to the United States
American Lutherans
University of North Dakota alumni
Democratic Party United States senators from North Dakota
People from Mercer County, North Dakota
Democratic Party governors of North Dakota
20th-century American politicians
20th-century Lutherans